Ihor Podushkin (born 1 November 1963) is a former football referee.

External links
 
 Ihor Podushkin referee profile at allplayers.in.ua

1963 births
Living people
Sportspeople from Kharkiv
Ukrainian football referees